The India Way: How India’s Top Business Leaders Are Revolutionizing Management is published by the Harvard Business Press. It's a non-fictional book written by Peter Cappelli, Harbir Singh, Jitendra Singh and Michael Useem of the Wharton School at the University of Pennsylvania. The book was released in the United States on March 23, 2010, and was released in India in May 2010. The India Way primarily focuses on the contrast in business management styles between the U.S. and India. Topics discussed in the book include topics such as leadership skills, company governance, human resources management and innovation. The authors’ conclusions are based on an analysis of nearly 130 interviews conducted with Indian CEOs and executives.

Overview
The key phrase of the book, "the India way", is coined by the authors to signify a particular style of business management which they argue is the unique engenderment of the culture and history of India. It is a modern take on an earlier book, the Toyota Way. The book’s major claim is that there are certain practices prevalent in Indian business, such as paying special attention to the management of human resources and engaging in corporate social responsibility, which could be extremely beneficial to other models of business, particularly those in the West.

According to the authors, the primary difference between Indian and Western business styles lies in the degree to which corporate goals and strategies reflect company core values. The book claims that as a general rule, Indian corporations are far less concerned with shareholder interests than Western businesses and that they prefer concentrate on the long term prosperity of the company, employees and surrounding community.  The book goes on to say that because Indian executives motivate their employees with larger company and social goals, they are afforded significantly higher levels of trust and respect from their workforce and communities than their Western counterparts.

Chapter summary
Chapter 1: The authors identify four key attributes of "the India way", which are as follows:

 Holistic Engagement of Employees
 Improvisation and Adaptability
 Creative Value Propositions
 Broad Mission & Purpose

Chapter 2: The authors explain the economic and historical context for "the India way" and present five distinct areas in which the key attributes of the business style are played out.

These topics, which are discussed in depth in the subsequent chapters, are as follows:

 People Management  (Chapter 3)
Indian businesses see their employees "as assets to be
developed, not costs to be reduced", and have a strong
sense of obligation to them. As a result, improving
workforce capability becomes an ongoing process.
 Executive Leadership  (Chapter 4)
This is a case of necessity creating a virtue. The
complexity of doing business in India means successful
companies have to be extremely flexible and creative
to achieve their ends (e.g. concepts like Jugaad among
others).
 Competitive Strategy  (Chapter 5)
Intense domestic competition and highly cost-conscious
consumers imply that Indian companies have become
skilled at developing new product and service concepts
(e.g. Tata Nano motor car).
 Company Governance (Chapter 6)
Instead of simply focusing on shareholder value, Indian companies, say the authors, are more inclined to consider family, social, and national goals in developing and executing their strategies. While acknowledging that some of the India way is a specific adaptation to Indian conditions, the authors argue that there are specific lessons in people management, executive leadership, competitive strategy, corporate governance, and social responsibility that can be applied by leaders of Western companies. Unlike the state capitalism of China, the India Way, say the authors, "preserves the logic of free markets and democratic institutions", yet "appears to avoid some of the apparent rapaciousness and excesses of the American model."
 Social Responsibility (Also Chapter 6)
 Comparisons made in the previous chapters and summarize their general conclusions (Chapter 7)

About the authors
The book is written by Peter Cappelli, George W. Taylor Professor of Management and director of the Center for Human Resources at the Wharton School, University of Pennsylvania, Harbir Singh, the William and Phyllis Mack Professor of Management and co-director of the Mack Center for Technological Innovation at the Wharton School and Jitendra Singh, the Saul P. Steinberg Professor of Management and former Vice Dean for International Academic Affairs at the Wharton School and Michael Useem,  William and Jacalyn Egan Professor of Management and director of the Center for Leadership and Change Management at the Wharton School.

References

External links
 May 17, 2010, Harvard Business Review "The India Way of Leading Business."
 April 14, 2010, Forbes. "The India Way of Doing Business."
 April 13, 2010, By John Baldoni, The Washington Post. "Leadership: Made in India."
 March 31, 2010, By Stefan Stern, The Financial Times. "India's New Management Model."
 March 31, 2010, By Jane M. Von Bergen, Philly.com. "Managing 'the India way'."
 March 29, 2010, SiliconIndia. "Indian CEO's Better than Western Counterparts."
 March 19, 2010, The Economic Times. "Professors of Indian origin at Ivy League biz schools in great demand."
 March 5, 2010, By Mark Tutton, CNN. "What bosses can learn from India's business leaders."
 March 1, 2010, By Peter Cappelli, Executive Online. "Leadership Lessons from India."

Business books
Books about India
Business models
2010 non-fiction books